Madeira Andebol S.A.D., known until 1998 as Academico Funchal, is a Portuguese handball club from Funchal. Its women's team has won the national championship a record 15 times since 1994, and it is a regular in the EHF Cup and Cup Winners' Cup's early stages. The male team has won the national league and national cup once, and it has also made several appearances in EHF competitions.

In 2016, the club entered into a partnership with C.S. Marítimo and merged the senior teams. Since then, the club has been known as Académico Marítimo Madeira Andebol SAD and adopted the same sponsors and equipment supplier, Nike, as Marítimo.

Men's section

Honours 

Portuguese League: 1
2004–05
Portuguese Cup: 1
1998–99

Squad 

  João Antunes
  Mauro Aveiro
  Bosko Bjelanovic
  Luis Carvalho
  João Ferraz
  Telmo Ferreira
  Jesus José
  Luis Marques
  João Mendes
  Leandro Nunes
  Pedro Pinheiro
  Hugo Rosário
  Daniel Santos
  Nuno Silva
  Gonçalo Vieira

Women's section

Honours 

 Portuguese Women's Championship: 14
1998–99, 1999–00, 2000–01, 2001–02, 2002–03, 2003–04, 2004–05, 2005–06, 2006–07, 2007–08, 2008–09, 2011–12, 2015-16, 2017-18
 Portuguese Women's Handball Cup: 18
1998–99, 1999–00, 2000–01, 2001–02, 2002–03, 2003–04, 2004–05, 2005–06, 2006–07, 2007–08, 2008–09, 2009–10, 2010–11, 2011–12, 2012–13, 2013-14, 2014-15, 2017-18
 Supertaça de Portugal: 20
1999, 2000, 2001, 2002, 2003, 2004, 2005, 2006, 2007, 2008, 2009, 2010, 2011, 2012, 2013, 2014, 2015, 2016, 2017, 2018

European record

Squad 

  Barbara Brauer
  Cilisia Camacho
  Carla Coimbra
  Ana Estacio
  Carla Ferreira
  Micaela Freitas
  Mariela Gonçalves
  Esmeralda Gouveia
  Sonia Leites
  Tanja Milanović
  Claudia Novais
  Ana Seabra
  Renata Tavares
  Maria Viana
  Cristina Vieira

References 

Portuguese handball clubs
Sport in Madeira
Handball clubs established in 1998
1998 establishments in Portugal